{{Infobox person
| name = Uli Edel
| image =
| image_size = 
| birth_name = Ulrich Edel
| birth_date =  
| birth_place = Neuenburg am Rhein, Germany
| spouse =  Gloria Edel
| parents = 
| awards = 1989 Bavarian Film Awards Best Director NYFCC and Boston Society of Film Critics Awards1990 Last Exit to Brooklyn, 1997 Golden Globes Best Mini Series of Motion Picture Made for TV
}}
Ulrich "Uli" Edel (born 11 April 1947) is a German film and television director, best known for his work on films such as Last Exit to Brooklyn and Body of Evidence.His Rasputin: Dark Servant of Destiny won a Golden Globe for Best Mini-Series or Motion Picture made for TV. Alan Rickman in the titular role won an Emmy and a Golden Globe for Best Actor. Ian McKellen, playing Tsar Nicholas II, won a Golden Globe for Best Supporting Actor.

Life and career
Edel was born in Neuenburg am Rhein, South Baden. He attended Jesuit Boarding School Kolleg Sankt Blasien from 1957 to 1966. After studying theatre science in Munich, he was accepted into Munich Film School alongside Bernd Eichinger. Uli befriended him and they started working together on their exercise movies, sharing a love for the nouvelle vague and Italian neorealism as well as popular U.S. mainstream cinema.

While still enrolled in film school, Edel started taking acting lessons. He wanted to know about the Stanislavski and Strasberg theories. After finishing the studies Uli worked as assistant director with Douglas Sirk and directed two TV productions.

In 1980 he joined Bernd Eichinger (production) and Herman Weigel (screenplay) for the authentic story of adolescent drug addict Christiane Felscherinow, Christiane F. – Wir Kinder vom Bahnhof Zoo. It turned out to be a big domestic and international success when it was released a year later. Six years later the three reactivated their partnership once more for another film—Last Exit to Brooklyn, based on Hubert Selby's dark, controversial 1964 novel about life on the breadline in 1952 Brooklyn. The musical score was provided by Mark Knopfler of rock band Dire Straits. Jennifer Jason Leigh won Best Supporting Actress awards from the New York Film Critics Circle and Boston Society of Film Critics for her performance as the tough, hard-drinking neighborhood prostitute Tralala, who is gang-raped in the story's tragic climax.

Further works include Body of Evidence, which was nominated for six Razzie Awards; Tyson; Rasputin, which won the Golden Globe for Best Mini-Series or Motion Picture Made for TV as well awards for Best Actor (Alan Rickman) and Best Supporting Actor (Ian McKellen); The Little Vampire; Purgatory, starring Sam Shepard and Eric Roberts; the 2001 mini series The Mists of Avalon; and the 2002 mini series Julius Caesar starring Jeremy Sisto, Christopher Walken and the late Richard Harris in his penultimate role.

In 2004 he directed a TV two-parter Dark Kingdom: The Dragon King, based on the Volsunga saga and the Nibelungenlied.

In 2008, his film The Baader Meinhof Complex was released in Germany. The critically acclaimed drama was nominated for a Golden Globe and an Oscar for Best Foreign Language Film.

Filmography
Director
 Der kleine Soldat (1971, short)
 Tommy kehrt zurück (1973)
 Der harte Handel (1978, TV film) — (based on a novel by Oskar Maria Graf)
  (1979, TV film) — (based on a novel by Franz Josef Wagner)
 Christiane F. (1981) — (based on the non-fiction book by Kai Hermann and Horst Rieck about Christiane F.)
 A Kind of Anger (1984, TV film) — (based on the novel A Kind of Anger by Eric Ambler)
 Last Exit to Brooklyn (1989) — (based on the novel Last Exit to Brooklyn by Hubert Selby Jr.)
 Twin Peaks: Double Play (1991, TV series episode)
 Body of Evidence (1992)
 Tales from the Crypt: Came the Dawn (1993, TV series episode)
 Confessions of a Sorority Girl (1994, TV film)
 Tyson (1995, TV film) — (based on the non-fiction book by José Torres about Mike Tyson)
 Rasputin: Dark Servant of Destiny (1996, TV film) — (biographical film about Grigori Rasputin)
 Homicide: Life on the Street (1997–1998, TV series, 4 episodes)
 Oz: Ancient Tribes (1998, TV series episode)
 Purgatory (1999, TV film)
 The Little Vampire (2000) — (based on the Der kleine Vampir books by Angela Sommer-Bodenburg)
 The Mists of Avalon (2001, TV film) — (based on the novel The Mists of Avalon by Marion Zimmer Bradley)
 King of Texas (2002, TV film) — (loosely based on Shakespeare's King Lear)
 Julius Caesar (2002, TV film) — (biographical film about Julius Caesar)
 Evil Never Dies (2003, TV film)
 Dark Kingdom: The Dragon King (2004, TV film) — (based on the Nibelungenlied)
 The Baader Meinhof Complex (2008) — (based on the non-fiction book by Stefan Aust about the Red Army Faction)
 Times Change You (2010) — (based on the autobiography of the German rapper Bushido)
 Hotel Adlon: A Family Saga (2013, TV miniseries) — (historical film about the Hotel Adlon)
 Houdini (2014, TV film) — (biographical film about Harry Houdini)
 Pay the Ghost (2015) — (based on a novelette by Tim Lebbon)
 The Club of the Singing Butchers (2019, TV film) — (based on the novel The Master Butchers Singing Club by Louise Erdrich)
 Under the Pear Tree (2019, TV film) — (based on a novella by Theodor Fontane)
Screenwriter
 Perahim – die zweite Chance'' (dir. Hans W. Geißendörfer, 1974, TV film) — (based on a novel by C. Virgil Gheorghiu)

Awards
1989 Bavarian Film Awards, Best Director 
1997 Golden Globes, Best Mini-Series or Motion Picture Made for TV

External links
 

1947 births
Living people
People from Breisgau-Hochschwarzwald
University of Television and Film Munich alumni
English-language film directors
Mass media people from Baden-Württemberg
Best Director German Film Award winners